Maguey may refer to various American plants:
 Genus Agave, especially
 Species Agave americana, the century plant
 Species Agave salmiana
 Genus Furcraea, a source of natural fiber
 Maguey flowers, an edible flower

Other uses
In music, Maguey also refers to:
Banda Maguey, a Mexican music band